Cephonodes janus is a moth of the family Sphingidae first described by William Henry Miskin in 1891. It is known from the Australian state of Queensland, Flores in Indonesia, and New Caledonia east of Australia.

The wingspan is about 50 mm. This species has a very narrow opaque margin around the wings, and a uniformly brown abdomen.

Subspecies
Cephonodes janus janus (Queensland)
Cephonodes janus austrosundanus Rothschild & Jordan, 1903 (Flores)
Cephonodes janus simplex Rothschild, 1894 (New Caledonia)

References

Cephonodes
Moths described in 1891